Lailoken (aka Merlyn Sylvester) was a semi-legendary madman and prophet who lived in the Caledonian Forest in the late 6th century. The Life of Saint Kentigern mentions "a certain foolish man, who was called Laleocen" living at or near the village of Peartnach (Partick) within the Kingdom of Strathclyde. Laleocen prophesied the death of King Rhydderch Hael.

As a wild man and seer living in the forests of what is now southern Scotland, Lailoken is often identified with Myrddin Wyllt, the Welsh forerunner of the Arthurian wizard Merlin. Myrddin is particularly associated with the Battle of Arfderydd in Cumberland (now Cumbria) and the area just to the north, over the border in modern Scotland; Myrddin fought for the losing side and, after the battle, went insane. 

There was also a late 15th-century story Lailoken and Kentigern which states: "...some say he was called Merlynum".

Lailoken may be a form of the name Llallogan, which occurs in the Welsh poem Cyfoesi Myrddin a Gwenddydd ei Chwaer (or "The Conversation of Merlin and his Sister Gwenddydd"), where Gwenddydd refers to Merlin as Llallawg and its diminutive, Llallwgan. The name is comparable to Modern Welsh *llallog “brother, friend, lord (as a form of address); honour, dignity”, also "a twin; twin(-like)".

See also 
 Myrddin Wyllt
 Suibhne Geilt – parallel figure in Irish legend

References

6th-century Scottish people
Legendary Scottish people
Arthurian legend
Britons of the North
Geoffrey of Monmouth
6th-century births
Year of death unknown
Prophets
Scottish Lowlands